Pierre Ghestem (14 February 1922, Lille – 9 March 2000, Lille) was a French bridge and checkers player.

Career
In 1947 he became the world champion in checkers. In bridge, he was a World Bridge Federation Grand Master. As a member of the France open team, he won the inaugural World Team Olympiad in 1960 and the Bermuda Bowl in 1956 (runner-up in 1954, third-place 1961 and 1963), as well as European titles in 1953, 1955, 1962 (second in 1956 and 1961).

In his early years Ghestem also played chess, and made it to the fourth position in the 1944 Chess Championship of North France.

In bridge, Pierre Ghestem is well known for his contributions to the theory of bidding. He invented and played the relay-based Monaco system with his regular partner René Bacherich.

Ghestem and Bacherich were unusually slow players. Covering the 1963 Bermuda Bowl in Playboy, Alfred Sheinwold called them "the slowest partnership in the world" with "no rivals as a pair". The British expatriate Alan Truscott told readers of his New York Times bridge column in 1967, "all the records in this area are held by the famous French partnership".

References

External links
 
 Pierre Ghestem, Gabungan Bridge Alumni Universitas Indonesia
 Search: 'pierre ghestem' at WorldCat 
  

 

1922 births
2000 deaths
French contract bridge players
Bermuda Bowl players
French draughts players
Players of international draughts
Contract bridge writers
Sportspeople from Lille
Articles containing video clips